The Five Keys were an American rhythm and blues vocal group who were instrumental in shaping this genre in the 1950s.

They were formed with the original name of Sentimental Four in Newport News, Virginia, US, in the late 1940s, and initially consisted of two sets of brothers - Rudy West and Bernie West, and Ripley Ingram and Raphael Ingram. Raphael Ingram left in 1949 and Maryland Pierce (March 25, 1932–July 22, 2021) and Thomas 'Dickie' Threatt became members in his place. At this juncture the name of the group was changed to The Five Keys.

They were signed to Aladdin Records in 1951, and in 1952 Rudy West left to join the United States Army, and he was replaced by Ulysses K. Hicks. When Hicks died of a heart attack in Boston in 1955, Rudy West returned to the group. In 1954 Dickie Smith left and was replaced with Ramon Loper. At this point the Five Keys were signed to Capitol Records, and their popularity increased, although more instrumentation was used.

The group was inducted into the Vocal Group Hall of Fame in 2002.
Rudy West died of a heart attack on May 14, 1998 at age 65.
Ramon Loper died on October 16, 2002, after a short illness.

Dickie Threatt, lead tenor from 1958-1961, died on October 9, 2007 in Newport News, Virginia.

Discography

Albums
The Best of the Five Keys (Aladdin 1956)
The Five Keys on the Town (Score 1957)
The Five Keys on Stage (Capitol 1957)
The Five Keys (King 1960)
Rhythm and Blues Hits Past and Present (King 1960)
The Fantastic Five Keys (Capitol 1962)

Singles

References

External links

American rhythm and blues musical groups
American vocal groups
Doo-wop groups
Groove Records artists